Frederick Edwin Le Grice  was an Anglican priest in the latter part of the  20th century.

He was born on 14 December 1911 at Harleston, Norfolk and educated at Queens' College, Cambridge. Ordained in 1936 he began his career with   curacies in Leeds and Paignton. Subsequently, Vicar of Totteridge he was then  appointed a Canon Residentiary of St Albans Cathedral, a post he held until his appointment as Dean of Ripon in 1968. He retired in 1984 after 16 years in post and died on 25 June 1992 at Ripon.

A large stained glass window in the Cathedral is dedicated to Edwin Le Grice. It features medieval stained glass found when the Cathedral was being restored and a line of one of his poems, "Surround us with your symphony of praise, God's messengers of light.'

References

1911 births
Alumni of Queens' College, Cambridge
Deans of Ripon
1992 deaths
People from Redenhall with Harleston